Marcos Espeche (born 18 June 1985) is an Argentine footballer who plays as a defender for Italian  club Pontedera.

Career
He spent most of his career in the lower divisions of Italian football.

He made his Serie B debut for Reggiana on 27 September 2020 in a game against Pisa, at the age of 35.

On 16 June 2021, he signed with Pontedera.

References

External links
 

1985 births
Living people
Footballers from Córdoba, Argentina
Argentine footballers
Association football defenders
Serie B players
Serie C players
Serie D players
S.S.D. Lucchese 1905 players
A.S. Gubbio 1910 players
A.C. Reggiana 1919 players
U.S. Città di Pontedera players
Argentine expatriate footballers
Argentine expatriate sportspeople in Italy
Expatriate footballers in Italy